Richard Newcombe (1779 – 1857) was an Anglican priest.

Newcombe was educated at Queens' College, Cambridge. He held incumbencies at Llanrhyddlad, Llanfwrog and Clocaenog.

He died on 7 August 1857.

References

1779 births
1857 deaths
Archdeacons of Merioneth
Alumni of Queens' College, Cambridge